Zygodesmus fuscus is a species of fungus with unknown classification.

It is known two forms of the species:
 Zygodesmus fuscus f. fuscus
 Zygodesmus fuscus f. geogena Sacc.

References

Basidiomycota enigmatic taxa